Monte Carlo biscuits are an Australian sweet biscuit that have been manufactured since  by Arnott's Biscuits Holdings.

Each biscuit comprises two biscuit layers sandwiching a creamy filling, while many such biscuits are moulded to a design, both sides of the Monte Carlo biscuit are rough. The biscuit layers have a mild taste of golden syrup, honey and coconut, and the cream layer consists of a vanilla flavoured cream filling surrounded by a thin toffee-like coating of raspberry jam.

The Monte Carlo biscuit is available in most Australian supermarkets, being typically sold in  packages of 12 individual biscuits and as one of the five biscuits in the Arnott's Assorted Creams  variety pack.

The biscuits were named after the city of Monte Carlo.

References

External links
 1951 video of manufacture of biscuits, including Monte Carlos (2 min 24 sec video with audio)

Australian snack foods
Biscuit brands
Australian brands
Cookie sandwiches